Something is Burning is a 1964 Greek musical film directed by Giannis Dalianidis.

Cast 
 Dinos Iliopoulos – Dinos Exarhopoulos
 Rena Vlahopoulou – Sofia Frantzi
 Martha Karagianni – Rena
 Hloi Liaskou – Popi Frantzi
 Elena Nathanael – Jenny Petridi
 Christos Negas – Fanis
 Kostas Voutsas – Klearhos
 Christos Tsaganeas – Mr. Petridis
 Giorgos Tsitsopoulos – Lelos
 Elsa Rizou – Anna
 Yorgos Vrasivanopoulos – Kostas Hatzipateras
 Alekos Tzanetakos – Sotiris
 Tolis Voskopoulos – Petros
 Angelos Mavropoulos - Hatzipateras
 Periklis Christoforidis - Nikolaidis
 Errikos Kontarinis - Athanasiou
 Kostas Papachristos - Apostolis
 Giorgos Velentzas - receptionist
 Babis Anthopoulos - Dinos Exarhopoulos
 Giannis Vogiatzis - man in the audience

References

External links 

1964 musical films
1964 films
Greek musical films
1960s Greek-language films
Films directed by Giannis Dalianidis